is a former Japanese football player.

Career
Nobuhisa Furukawa joined the Uruguayan Segunda División club Atenas de San Carlos in 2013. He moved to the J3 League club Kataller Toyama in 2015.

References

External links

1994 births
Living people
Association football people from Hiroshima Prefecture
Japanese footballers
J3 League players
Kataller Toyama players
Association football forwards